Pidansom (: Chouduan Island) is a river island in the Yalu river in North Korea. Pidansom was developed by merging of several river islands such as Sindo Island (薪島) and Maando (馬鞍島) in the 1960s. The island is home to a fishing cooperative and is also used for agriculture.

See also 
Sindo County

References

River islands of North Korea